Athani is a village in the  
Aranthangi revenue block of Pudukkottai district, Tamil Nadu, India.

Demographics 

As per the 2001 census, Athani had a total population of 2691 with 1338 males and 1353 females. Out of the total population 1564 people were literate.

External links
 rakkammal koil

References

Villages in Pudukkottai district